Shiv Prasad Kanaujia is an Indian politician from the Bharatiya Janata Party and President of Shiv Dulari Foundation

References 

Living people
1965 births
People from Hardoi district
Members of the Uttar Pradesh Legislative Assembly
Bharatiya Janata Party politicians from Uttar Pradesh